Claude Louis Hector de Villars, Prince de Martigues, Marquis then Duc de Villars, Vicomte de Melun (8 May 1653 – 17 June 1734) was a French military commander and an illustrious general of Louis XIV of France. He was one of only six Marshals to have been promoted Marshal General of France.

Early career
Villars was born at Moulins (in the present-day département of Allier) in a noble but poor family — his father was the diplomat Pierre de Villars. He entered the French army through the corps of pages in 1671. He distinguished himself at twenty in the Siege of Maastricht in 1673 during the Franco-Dutch War and after the bloody Battle of Seneffe a year later he was promoted on the field to mestre de camp (colonel) of a cavalry regiment.

The next promotion would take time in spite of a long record of service under Turenne, The Great Condé and Luxembourg, and of his aristocratic birth, as he had incurred the enmity of the powerful Louvois. He was finally made maréchal de camp in 1687.

In the interval between the Dutch wars and the formation of the League of Augsburg, Villars, who combined with his military gifts the tact and subtlety of a diplomat, was employed in an unofficial mission to the court of Bavaria, and there became the constant companion of Maximilian II Emanuel, Elector of Bavaria.

He returned to France in 1690 and was given a command in the cavalry of the army in Flanders, but towards the end of the War of the Grand Alliance, in 1698, he went to Vienna as ambassador.

War of the Spanish Succession

It was Villars' part in the next war, beginning with Friedlingen (1702) and Hochstadt (1703) and ending with Denain (1712), that has made him most famous. For his part in the battle of Friedlingen he received the marshalate, and for the pacification of the insurgent Cévennes he received the Saint-Esprit order and the title of duke. Friedlingen and Hochstadt were barren victories, and the campaigns of which they formed were characterized by lost opportunities. Villars' glory thus begins with the year 1709 when France, apparently helpless, was roused to a great effort of self-defence by the stringent demands of the Coalition.

In that year he was called to command the main army opposing Prince Eugène of Savoy and Marlborough on the northern frontier. During the famine of the winter he shared the soldiers' miserable rations. When the campaign opened the old Marshal Boufflers volunteered to serve under him, and after the terrible battle of Malplaquet, in which he was gravely wounded (by a musketball to the knee), he was able to tell the king: "If it please God to give your majesty's enemies another such victory, they are ruined."

Two more campaigns passed without a battle and with scarcely any advance on the part of the invaders, but at last Marlborough manoeuvred Villars out of the famous Ne plus ultra lines, and the power of the defence seemed to be broken. But Louis made a last effort, the English contingent and its great leader were withdrawn from the enemy's camp, and Villars, though still suffering from his Malplaquet wounds, outmanoeuvred and decisively defeated Eugène at Denain. 
This victory saved France, though the war dragged on for another year, where Villars led the Rhine campaign (1713), in which he took Landau, led the stormers at Freiburg and negotiated the Treaty of Rastatt and the Treaty of Baden with Prince Eugène.

As a result of his contribution, his title was granted Grandee of Spain status by Philip V.

Villars residence
Villars, named for Marshal Villars, was built in Moulins, Allier during the reign of Louis XV. The 18th century historical monument was used as a cavalry barracks. It was partially destroyed during World War II and was restored by François Voinchet, Architect of Historic Monuments and is now the Centre National du Costume de Scene museum.

Regency

Villars played a conspicuous part in the politics of the Regency period as the principal opponent of Cardinal Dubois, and only the memories of Montmorency's rebellion prevented his being made constable of France. He took the field for the last time in the War of the Polish Succession (1734), with the title marshal-general of the king's armies, that Turenne had held before him. But he was over eighty years old at this point, and after opening the campaign energetically he died at Turin on 17 June 1734.

Legacy
Villars's memoirs show us a fanfaron plein d'honneur, as Voltaire calls him. He was indeed boastful, and also covetous of honours and wealth. But he was also described as an honourable man of high courage, moral and physical, and certainly a very skilled soldier. He was famous for his love for young men as wrote the Duchess of Orleans in her letters.

The memoirs, part of which was published in 1734 and afterwards several times republished in untrustworthy versions, were for the first time completely edited by the Marquis de Vogüé in 1884–92.

References
 Sturgill, Claude C., Marshal Villars and the War of the Spanish Succession, [Lexington]: University of Kentucky Press, [1965].

External links

 The French Army 1600–1900

1653 births
1734 deaths
Military personnel from Moulins, Allier
People of the Regency of Philippe d'Orléans
People of the Ancien Régime
French military personnel of the Franco-Dutch War
French military personnel of the Nine Years' War
French army commanders in the War of the Spanish Succession
French military personnel of the War of the Polish Succession
Marshals General of France
Members of the Académie Française
Princes of Martigues
Dukes of Villars
Marquesses of Villars
Viscounts of Melun
Secretaries of State for War (France)
Governors of Provence
Knights of the Golden Fleece of Spain
Peers created by Louis XIV